Christopher Paul Doering (born May 19, 1973) is an American former college and professional football player who was a wide receiver in the National Football League (NFL) for seven seasons during the 1990s and 2000s.  Doering played college football for the University of Florida, and thereafter, he played professionally for the Indianapolis Colts, the Denver Broncos, the Washington Redskins, and the Pittsburgh Steelers of the NFL.

Early life 

Doering was born in Gainesville, Florida in 1973.  He attended P.K. Yonge High School in Gainesville, where he was a standout prep athlete for the P.K. Yonge Blue Wave in three sports.

College career 

Doering attended the University of Florida in Gainesville, where he was a walk-on player for coach Steve Spurrier's Florida Gators football team in 1991.  The Gators coaching staff decided to redshirt him in 1991, and subsequently Doering received an athletic scholarship and played for the Gators from 1992 to 1995.  Doering not only earned a scholarship, the former walk-on set records: Doering caught 149 receptions (sixth best in Gators history) for 2,107 yards (tenth best in Gators history) and thirty-one touchdowns (best in Gators and 2nd best in SEC history as DeVonta Smith of Alabama broke this record November 21, 2020 vs Kentucky ) during his career at Florida.  His best-remembered play as a Gator was the game-winning touchdown pass he caught from Gators quarterback Danny Wuerffel to defeat the Kentucky Wildcats, 24–20, in 1993.  Sometimes called "The Catch," it is also remembered as "Doering's Got a Touchdown" after the repeated exclamation made by Gator radio host Mick Hubert during his broadcast of the game.  During his four seasons as a Gator, the team won three straight Southeastern Conference (SEC) championships (1993, 1994, 1995); as senior team captain in 1995, he received first-team All-SEC and second-team All-American honors.

Doering graduated from Florida with a bachelor's degree in telecommunications in 1995, and he was inducted into the University of Florida Athletic Hall of Fame as a "Gator Great" in 2006.  He was picked as the No. 19 greatest Gator from the first 100 years of Florida football in a 2006 article series published by The Gainesville Sun.

Professional career 

The Jacksonville Jaguars selected Doering in the sixth round (185th pick overall) of the 1996 NFL Draft, but the Jaguars traded him to the Indianapolis Colts before the start of the  season.  He played for the Colts in three games in two seasons (–), but saw little action.  The Colts waived him February 1998.  The Cincinnati Bengals signed Doering a week later, but waived him before the  regular season began.

In , Doering signed with the Denver Broncos and appeared in three games. In , the Pittsburgh Steelers signed him, and he saw action in nineteen games through , with eighteen catches for 240 yards and a touchdown.

Doering finished his journeyman NFL career with 42 receptions for 476 yards and three touchdowns.

Life after football 
Doering was co-host (with Adam "The Oilcan" Reardon) a sports radio talk show called "The Sports Fix" and broadcast on ESPN Radio AM 900 and AM 1230 in Gainesville and Ocala, Florida and he was an occasional sideline reporter for Westwood One football coverage.  In August 2015 Doering joined ESPN as a studio analyst after previously contributing to SEC Network events and ESPN specials.  He signed a multi-year contract extension to continue as a contributor across ESPN and SEC Network programming, including SEC Network's signature news and information show, SEC Now. Doering operates and is president of a home loan mortgage brokerage in Gainesville. He has two children.  Doering, along with former Gator teammate Judd Davis, plays jai alai matches at Ocala Poker and Jai Alai, without an audience or wagering, in order to satisfy Florida licensing requirements for the facility's card room.

See also 

 Florida Gators football, 1990–99
 List of Florida Gators football All-Americans
 List of Florida Gators in the NFL Draft
 List of NCAA major college football yearly receiving leaders
 List of Pittsburgh Steelers players
 List of University of Florida alumni
 List of University of Florida Athletic Hall of Fame members
 List of Washington Redskins players

References

Bibliography 
 Carlson, Norm, University of Florida Football Vault: The History of the Florida Gators, Whitman Publishing, LLC, Atlanta, Georgia (2007).  .
 Golenbock, Peter, Go Gators!  An Oral History of Florida's Pursuit of Gridiron Glory, Legends Publishing, LLC, St. Petersburg, Florida (2002).  .
 Hairston, Jack, Tales from the Gator Swamp: A Collection of the Greatest Gator Stories Ever Told, Sports Publishing, LLC, Champaign, Illinois (2002).  .
 McCarthy, Kevin M.,  Fightin' Gators: A History of University of Florida Football, Arcadia Publishing, Mount Pleasant, South Carolina (2000).  .
 Nash, Noel, ed., The Gainesville Sun Presents The Greatest Moments in Florida Gators Football, Sports Publishing, Inc., Champaign, Illinois (1998).  .
 Varley, Teresa, "Better Late Than Never: Persistence paying nice dividends for WR Chris Doering," Steelers Digest, pp.  13– 14 (2003).

1973 births
Living people
Players of American football from Gainesville, Florida
American football wide receivers
Florida Gators football players
Jacksonville Jaguars players
Indianapolis Colts players
Cincinnati Bengals players
Denver Broncos players
Washington Redskins players
Pittsburgh Steelers players
Houston Texans players